Teresa de Haro may refer to:

 Teresa Díaz de Haro, daughter of Diego López II de Haro, lady of Biscay
 Teresa Díaz II de Haro (born before 1254), daughter of Diego López III de Haro, wife of Juan Núñez I de Lara, mother of Juan Núñez II de Lara, amongst others. Lady of Biscay.